Butler Cole Aspinall (11 November 1830 – 4 April 1875) was a British-born journalist, barrister who migrated with his young wife to Melbourne, Australia, at first as an editor and writer for The Argus. He soon took up his lucrative legal practice as a defence advocate and later as a politician in the state of Victoria.

Aspinall was one of the chief counsel for the leaders of the Ballarat Riots, also known as Eureka Stockade, and later defended Henry James O'Farrell for the attempted assassination of Prince Alfred, Duke of Edinburgh. He was briefly appointed as Attorney-General in 1861 and Solicitor-General in 1870.

Aspinall died in April 1875 in Liverpool, England.

Biography and career
The son of the Reverend James Aspinall, Butler Cole Aspinall was born in Liverpool, Lancashire, England, in 1830, educated for the law, and was called to the Bar in 1853. He engaged in newspaper work, contributing to the Morning Chronicle and other London papers. In 1854, he came to Melbourne as a law reporter for The Argus, and also contributed to the Morning Herald, Age, and Melbourne Punch. He soon began to practise as a barrister and gained a great reputation as an advocate, and as a wit and humorist.

Eureka Stockade trial
In February 1855, Aspinall was one of the counsel for the leaders of the Eureka Rebellion.

Politics
In 1856, Aspinall was elected a member of the Victorian Legislative Assembly for Talbot. He also represented Castlemaine (1859–60), Geelong East (1861–64), Portland (1866–67) and St Kilda (1868–1870). At the end of July 1861 he became Attorney-General in the Richard Heales ministry, but the cabinet resigned a few weeks later. He resigned as member for St Kilda on 1 January 1870, was appointed Solicitor-General in the John MacPherson ministry, on 19 January 1870, before resigning on 9 April 1870 with the rest of the ministry.

Court practice
Aspinall was a first-rate advocate and a good parliamentary debater, but he broke down when 40 years old, an age when most men are scarcely past the beginning of their career. He had much charm of manner, and stories of his wit and humour were still being told in legal circles 70 years after his death. The Dictionary of Australian Biography quotes one example of his inspired impudence, which arose out of a brush with a Victorian judge.

Henry James O'Farrell trial
In 1868 Aspinall defended Henry James O'Farrell at Sydney for the attempted assassination of Prince Alfred, Duke of Edinburgh, and from January to April 1870 he was solicitor-general in the John Alexander MacPherson ministry. Towards the end of this year he resigned his seat in parliament, and in 1871 had a mental breakdown and was confined for some time. On recovering he returned to England and died there on 4 April 1875. He was married and his wife, who had been left in Melbourne, died six days later.

Personal life
A son, also called Butler Cole Aspinall, who was educated in England, became a London barrister and an authority on shipping law. He died unmarried in London on 15 November 1935.

References

 J. H. Heaton, Australian Dictionary of Dates;
 J. L. Forde, The Story of the Bar of Victoria;
 The Bulletin, 15 January 1936.
 

 

1830 births
1875 deaths
19th-century Australian lawyers
Attorneys-General of the Colony of Victoria
Solicitors-General of Victoria
Members of the Victorian Legislative Assembly
19th-century Australian politicians
English emigrants to colonial Australia